Sick of Myself is a 2022 Norwegian comedy-drama film directed by Kristoffer Borgli, starring , , Fanny Vaager, Fredrik Stenberg Ditlev-Simonsen,  and .

Cast
  as Signe
  as Thomas
 Fanny Vaager as Marte
 Andrea Bræin Hovig as Lisa
 Henrik Mestad as Espen
 Anders Danielsen Lie as doctor
 Steinar Klouman Hallert as Stian
 Fredrik Stenberg Ditlev-Simonsen as Yngve
  as Emma
  as Beate

Release
The film premiered at the Cannes Film Festival on 22 May 2022.

Reception
Bianca O'Neill of Time Out rated the film 5 stars out of 5, writing that "a perfectly executed black comedy accompanied by humorously viscious counter-culture commentary that cannot be overlooked." Cédric Succivalli of the International Cinephile Society rated the film 4 stars out of 5 and wrote, "Anchored by an exceptionally strong performance, and told in the stark and confrontational style that we have grown to expect from Scandinavian cinema, the film is a masterful achievement in socially-charged storytelling." 

Angie Hans of The Hollywood Reporter wrote that "the sly pleasure of Sick of Myself is that Signe’s narcissism differs from the rest of ours more in degree than kind. Her impulses are as uproarious as they are repulsive not because they’re so hard to understand, but because on some level, we can understand them all too well." Amber Wilkinson of Screen Daily wrote that "The only problem with taking things to extremes is that it can lead to there being nowhere left to go but, if Sick of Myself runs out of narrative road towards the end, there’s still a decent quotient of dark humour along the way."

Ella Kemp of IndieWire gave the film a rating of "B-". Hannah Strong of Little White Lies wrote that the film "appears so one-note there’s never any threat of deeper meaner or commentary on societal beauty standards and the voracious appetites of social media influencers." Damon Wise of Deadline Hollywood wrote that 'There are two very intriguing stories going on here; one is an irreverent skit on society, the media, and the celebrity of victimhood, the other is a tender portrait of a sad, lonely woman who’ll do anything to feel seen. But there’s a yawning gap in the middle — and it’s the sense of what’s missing here that lingers, not what’s there."

References

External links
 
 

Norwegian comedy-drama films
2022 comedy-drama films